The Oneonta was a sidewheel steamboat that operated on the Columbia River from 1863 to 1877.

Design
Oneonta was one of the rare examples of a Mississippi-style riverboat built on the Columbia River.  Typical of the Mississippi-style were the two funnels forward of the pilot house, with sidewheels instead of sternwheels at the preferred design, and the pilot house itself being located near the middle of the boat.

Operation

Oneonta ran on the stretch of the Columbia River between the Cascade Rapids eastward to The Dalles, where another longer stretch of whitewater.  The rapids east of The Dalles were generally known as Celilo Falls.  There were portages around both sets of rapids. Originally these just tracks, but they were gradually replace first railways, first drawn by mules and then by steam engines.  Oregon Steam Navigation Company built Oneonta in an effort to control both the portages and the middle river route connecting them as the only feasible transport line to the gold rushes that were going on in Eastern Oregon and Idaho in the 1860s. When this business tampered off, in 1870, the president of O.S.N., John C. Ainsworth took Oneonta down through the Cascade Rapids at high water to run on the lower Columbia.

Disposition
Oneonta was taken out of service in 1877 and served as barge until being abandoned in 1880.

Notes

Passenger ships of the United States
Steamboats of the Columbia River
Steamboats of Oregon
1863 ships
Oregon Steam Navigation Company